Fergus (Vodarek Field) Aerodrome  is located  east northeast of Fergus, Ontario, Canada.

See also
 List of airports in the Fergus area

References

Registered aerodromes in Ontario
Centre Wellington

pms:Fergus (Juergensen Field) Airport